Komadur Padmanabhan (born 13 November 1937) is an Indian former cricketer. He played first-class cricket for Andhra and Hyderabad between 1957 and 1965.

See also
 List of Hyderabad cricketers

References

External links
 

1937 births
Living people
Indian cricketers
Andhra cricketers
Hyderabad cricketers
Cricketers from Hyderabad, India